Nyhavn 31 is a listed property overlooking the Nyhavn canal in central Copenhagen, Denmark.

History

17th and 18th centuries

The property was listed in Copenhagen's first cadastre of 1689 as No. 11 in St. Ann's East Quarter. It was owned by skipper Mikkel Jensen at that time. The present building on the site was constructed with two storeys  for skipper Thomas Andersen between 1691 and 1714. The property was listed in the new cadastre of 1756 as No. 16 in St. Ann's East Quarter and was owned by skipper Peder Løg at that time.

The wealthy merchant Andreas Bodenhoff acquired the property in 1770 and lived there until his death in 1794. At the time of the 1787 census, he lived there with his son Andreas, his daughter Giertrud, the clerks Conrath Ditlew Hopman	() and Christian Lund, three caretakers and two maids.

19th century
The next owner was wholesaler Edvard Gram (1769-1858). He heightened the building with one floor in 1799. At the time of the 1801 census, he resided in the building with his 17-year-old wife Christiane Bech, four employees in his grocery business, a caretaker, a coachman and two maids.

In the new cadastre of 1806, the property was again listed as No. 16. It was by then still owned by Gram.

The merchant Hans Puggaard and his wife Bolette, a painter, resided in the building in 1826 but moved to Nyhavn 42 the following year. They socialized with many of the leading artists of the day. Their daughter Maria, who was only three years old at the time, would later marry the politician Orla Lehmann . Søren Henrik Petersen (1788–1860), a printmaker, was for a while also among the residents.

 
The property was later acquired by the merchant Niels Høeg Husted (c. 1793-1835). His property was home to 11 residents in two households at the 1834 census. The owner resided on the first floor with his wife Rosaline Sophie Husted, three employees in his wholesale business, one male servant and two maids. Rosaline Sophie Husted was in her first marriage the mother of the opera singer Ida Wulff. In 1831, she had married the military officer and later postmaster Ernst Frederik von Holstein. Peter Christian Knudtzon, another merchant, resided on the second floor with his son Jess Nicolaj Knudtzen (then in Spain) and one maid.

The property was home to 14 residents in three households at the 1840 census. W. Holtmann, a senior clerk, resided on the ground floor with grocer Chr. Anton Jørgensen, grocer Hans Christian Huus and one maid. Peter Christian Knudtzon was now residing on the first floor with his wife L. Knudtzon, one male servant and one maid. P. S. Giessing, a broker, resided on the second floor with his wife C. C. Giessing, his son Søren Sommer Giessing, his niece Sophie Gotlibsen and one maid.

The property was home to 35 residents in four households at the 1850 census. Christian von Lövenfeldt (1803-1866), a kammerjunker and captain in the first Livjæger Corps, resided on the ground floor with his wife Camilla Adellaide (née Glahn), their three children (aged three to 11), one male servant and two maids. Isaac Salemonsen, a textile manufacturer, resided on the first floor with his wife Hannshen Salomsen, their eight children (aged nine to 20), the widow Amalie Salomonsen	, the visitor Henriette Salemonsen, a governess and two maids. P. S. Giessing, who now worked as a painter, resided on the second floor with his wife, office clerk Thedor Blankenstein, one male servant and one maid. Seyer M. Jürgensen, a skipper, resided in the basement with his wife Christiane Frederikke (née Bede), their two children (aged two and four), two maids and one lodger.

Hans Georg Worm's wholesale company H.G. Worm & Co. was from its foundation in 1865 based on the second floor of the rear wing. In 1982, it launched a collaboration with Jönköping Tändstickfabrik. By 1875, H. C. Worm & Co. sold a total of 0.7 million match boxes, many of which were exported to North and South America. Thorvald Giessing operated another wholesale company from the No. 31 in the years 18771918. Christian Gelert's wholesale business was from 1888 to 1901 based in the building.

20th century
 

A/S Oscar Frønckel & Co.'s Bogtrykkeri, a book printing business founded at Store Kongensgade 81 in 1916, was from 1918 based in larger premises at Nyhavn 31.

The building was listed by the Danish Heritage Agency in the Danish national registry of protected buildings in 1945. It was restored by the architect Alfred Homann  in 1981. The building has both housed the Royal Danish Theatre's administration while the building on Kongens Nytorv was refurbished and the Danish Library Agency. In 2010–11, CFP Groupe  purchased the building and converted it into apartments.

Architecture
 
The building is five bays wide. Two consecutive rear wings extend from the rear side of the building. The first is from circa 1800 while the one to the rear is from the first half of the 18th century.

Today
The building is now home to an Italian restaurant.

References

External links

 Nyhavn at indenforvoldene.dk
 Source
Theodor Giessing

Houses in Copenhagen
Listed residential buildings in Copenhagen
Houses completed in 1799